Chlorolestes fasciatus, the mountain malachite or mountain sylph is a species of damselfly in the family Synlestidae. It is found in Lesotho, South Africa and Eswatini. Its natural habitat is montane streams.

It is 39–54 mm long with a wingspan of 49–64 mm. Males and females are similar; the thorax and abdomen are metallic-green aging to coppery brown. The thorax has contrasting yellow antehumeral stripes; these are more narrow than those of the similar Forest Malachite. Most mature males have opalescent and blackish wing bands.

References

Odonata of Africa
Insects of South Africa
Synlestidae
Insects described in 1839